GMO OMG is a 2013 American pseudoscientific documentary film which takes a negative view towards the use of genetically modified organisms used in the production of food, in the United States. The film focuses on Monsanto, a multinational agrochemical and agricultural biotechnology corporation, and their role in the food industry alongside the effects of GMOs and how they are generated.

Directed by Jeremy Seifert and produced by Elizabeth Kucinich, it was given a limited release in the United States on September 13, 2013, and received negative reviews from critics. GMO OMG follows Seifert's search of answers: how do GMOs affect people and the planet. These and other questions take Seifert on a journey from his family’s table to Haiti, Paris, Norway, and agra-giant Monsanto.

The sole study specifically cited was widely discredited; see Séralini affair.

Film content

Jeremy Seifert’s goal in GMO OMG is to say that citizens of the U.S. are inadequately informed about the corporate manipulation of the food supply. Seifert travels to Haiti, Norway and Paris and interviews commercial and private farmers in order to understand more about their use in these industries. In Haiti Seifert explores the Peasant Movement of Papaye’s resistance towards the help of Monsanto and continues his travels to the Svalbard Global Seed Vault that contains 700,000 samples of seeds from every country on earth to prevent the extinction of certain plant species. Seifert ends his world travels in Paris where he talks to scientists about the effects of GMOs on humans. While at home in the U.S. Seifert travels through California to different farms with his family to emphasize how important it is to him that people be more concerned with what they are eating themselves and feeding their families. Seifert also travels to a Monsanto location where he is rejected.

GMOs and farming

GMO stands for Genetically Modified Organism and includes any organism whose genes have been artificially altered to modify their characteristics in some way or another. Genetic engineering does not occur in nature and involves a scientific process including isolation and removal of DNA encoding in a single gene from one organism, manipulating it outside the cell and reinserting it into the same organism or into the genetic material of another organism. The main goal for this process is to introduce a new or altered characteristic to the target organism for desired traits such as resistance to insects and GMOs can even be found in helping with the production of certain medicines and vaccines.

GMO OMG outlines two types of GMOs used in farming, pesticide producers and herbicide resisters. Pesticide producers are plants that can kill insects with an introduced toxin while herbicide resisters are immune to weed killer which allows farmers to use herbicides on crops leaving the plant unharmed. Seifert claims that commercial farmers utilize GMOs to produce crops faster for more profit while private owned farms continue to use traditional farming methods because of their dedication to maintaining the most natural process of growing food.

Peasant movement of Papaye

GMO OMG includes a brief segment on the earthquake that hit Haiti in 2010 with a 7.0 magnitude, not only destroying the homes of Haitian's but also their food crops. Monsanto offered Haiti's citizens 475 tons of seeds for farmers to regrow these crops that were destroyed in the process. Haitian farmers and citizens of the Papaye Peasant Movement, an alliance of people who fight to provide unity of all the peasants of Haiti and promote cultural and economic growth, did not consider this to be helpful, according to the film. The Haitian peasants believed that Monsanto had ulterior motives. Monsanto is a well known corporation in the United States known for their involvement in the agricultural industry, however, the Haitian's believed their gratuities were only due to corporate greed and in the interest of obtaining more profits. Consequentially, this friction between the Peasant Movement and Monsanto created unrest among the Haitians. Haitians showed resistance towards the company by burning thousands of pounds of seeds and refusing to use their GMOs. Executive Director Chavannes Jean-Baptiste, who is also the spokesperson for the National Peasant Movement of the Congress of Papaye, called Monsanto’s donation of seeds an attack on small agriculture, farms, biodiversity, Creole seeds, and on the remnants of Haiti’s environment.

Monsanto

Monsanto is a corporation involved in the bio-tech and agricultural industries. The bio-tech industry is an industry that specializes in the production of GMOs. Monsanto is most known for their developments in GMOs, however, their success has affected private industry farms and legislation in certain states because of its superiority in biotechnology, according to GMO OMG. In the film, Seifert highlighted that Monsanto has been involved in lawsuits over matters such as patent infringement due to cross pollination of GMOs in commercial farms to plants in private farms. This cross pollination happens when pollen from GMO crops is carried for miles by insects, birds, and the wind to other crops that are then pollinated with the GMOs creating legal crops containing GMO embryos making seed saving a patent issue. Monsanto also threatened to sue the state of Connecticut for wanting to instill a GMO labeling provision that would require products using GMOs to be labeled. Seifert made an attempt to speak with Monsanto and traveled to one of their locations but was immediately kicked out when he asked if he could speak to them about their GMOs.

Reviews and criticisms
The documentary received mixed reviews. Rotten Tomatoes rated the documentary at 56% approval rating based on 16 critics' reviews, with an average score of 5.25/10.

Jeannette Catsoulis of The New York Times calling it, "a gentle, flyover alert to obliviously chowing-down citizens ... without hectoring and with no small amount of charm". RogerEbert.com claims that GMO OMG is an advocacy film inspired by Michael Moore's "Roger and Me", a documentary in which Moore sets out to find the answer to why General Motors closed all of its plants in Flint, Michigan beginning in 1978.  Simon Abrams, the writer of "GMO OMG"'s review on the Roger Ebert website, states that "Seifert's arguments are dependent on unconvincing testimony and leaps in logic" and that "Seifert is apparently mistrustful of scientific terms, studies, and concepts".  RogerEbert.com gave "GMO OMG" a one star rating out of a possible five.

Michael Specter of the New Yorker wrote a scathing review of the documentary in which he dubbed the film "aggressively uninformed".  Specter furthers Abram's notion that the documentary is based on the unreliable testimony of witnesses who are not actually scientists, and that Seifert's film is characterized by intellectual laziness. Scientific American wrote a review titled ""GMO OMG" SRSLY? An #EpicFail in Exercising Our Right To Know", which debunks Seifert's verdict of "science of still out" on whether GMO's are harmful or not. Ferris Jabr, the author of the article, claims that GMO OMG utilizes biased research and statistics that are taken out of their original context.

References

External links
 
 
 
 

2013 films
Anti-GMO movement
American documentary films
2013 documentary films
Documentary films about agriculture
Documentary films about environmental issues
Pseudoscience documentary films
American independent films
2013 independent films
2010s English-language films
2010s American films